Kiante Tripp (born October 7, 1987, in Atlanta, Georgia) is a former gridiron football defensive tackle. Tripp also played in the National Football League for the Cleveland Browns in 2011.  He played college football for the University of Georgia.  Tripp is also a member of Omega Psi Phi fraternity.

References

External links
Toronto Argonauts bio
Cleveland Browns bio
Georgia Bulldogs bio

1987 births
Living people
Players of American football from Atlanta
American football defensive tackles
Georgia Bulldogs football players
Atlanta Falcons players
Cleveland Browns players
Toronto Argonauts players
Hamilton Tiger-Cats players
Brooklyn Bolts players